S.S. Cosmos is a Sanmarinese football club, based in Serravalle and founded in 1979. Cosmos currently plays in Girone A of Campionato Sammarinese di Calcio. The team's colors are green and yellow.
The club is named after the New York Cosmos team.

Achievements 
Campionato Sammarinese di Calcio: 1
 2000–01
Coppa Titano: 4
 1980, 1981, 1995, 1999
San Marino Federal Trophy: 3
 1995, 1998, 1999

Current squad

European record

Cosmos 2007/08

Staff 
 President : Luca Della Balda	
 Segretary : Stefano Bevitori
 Club Director : Maximiliano Gobbi	
 Treasurer : Federico Pedini Amati
 Cassiere : Federico Marzi
 Head Coach : Roberto Sarti
 Coach 2^ : Ivan Toccaceli
 Team Manager : Francesco Donnini
 Masseur : Urbinati Sergio (Barone)
 Contributor : Christian Paolini

External links 
 www.cosmos.sm

Cosmos
Association football clubs established in 1979
1979 establishments in San Marino
Serravalle (San Marino)